is located in Kawasaki, Kanagawa, Japan.

Physical attributes
Kawasaki Racecourse has a dirt course.

The dirt course measures 1200 meters (5/8 mile + 637 feet).
900m, 1400m, 1500m, 1600m, 2000m and 2100m races run on the oval.

Notable races

External links
 Official site 

Horse racing venues in Japan
Sports venues in Kawasaki, Kanagawa
1906 establishments in Japan
Sports venues completed in 1906